

This is a list of the National Register of Historic Places listings in Pulaski County, Arkansas.

This is intended to be a complete list of the properties and districts on the National Register of Historic Places in Pulaski County, Arkansas, United States. The locations of National Register properties and districts for which the latitude and longitude coordinates are included below, may be seen in a map.

There are 353 properties and districts listed on the National Register in the county, including 5 National Historic Landmarks. The 86 properties and districts that are located outside of Little Rock (including one National Historic Landmark) are listed here, while the sites in Little Rock are listed separately. Another 26 properties in the county have been removed, including 6 outside Little Rock.

Current listings

Little Rock

Exclusive of Little Rock

|}

Former listings

|}

See also

List of National Historic Landmarks in Arkansas
National Register of Historic Places listings in Arkansas

References

 
Pulaski